The 2023 Pakistani protests are a continuing series of protests across Pakistan during March 2023. The protests are due to the possible arrest of former Prime Minister Imran Khan as the district and sessions court of Islamabad issued an arrest warrant. In Zaman Park, there was intense shelling. All routes leading to the park were blocked due to the protests.

Background
A Toshakhana reference case had been registered against Imran Khan by the Election Commission of Pakistan and he was constantly staying away from the hearing, as a result the district and sessions court of Islamabad again issued an arrest warrant and ordered the police to produce him at the next hearing.  On the other hand Imran says that the arrest aims at election removal.

Series of incidents

14 March 
Protests broke out in Islamabad the capital of Pakistan on Tuesday at the call of the former prime minister and PTI chairman. As police and party workers continued to clash outside of his Zaman Park residence in Lahore. Police also used gas and a water cannon on supporters outside Zaman Park. Police also arrested party workers. Intense tear gas shelling was reported in Zaman Park.

15 March 
The legal team of Imran approached the Islamabad High Court (IHC) on 15 March 2023 and requested it to suspend Khan's non-bailable arrest warrants in the Toshakhana case, but the high court directed the deposed prime minister's counsel to move the trial court as the order for his arrest was "in line with the law".

On the other hand, PTI also filed a petitioned in Lahore High Court to suspend the warrant orders however, on 15 March 2023, the Lahore High Court (LHC) ordered the police to halt their operations in Lahore's Zaman Park until Thursday morning (16 March), despite their apparent failure to apprehend Pakistan Tehreek-e-Insaf chairman Imran Khan. Seeing that the Pakistan Super League had relocated to the capital of Punjab for the playoff stage, the LHC ordered this decision.

16 March 
Imran, the chairman of the Pakistan Tehreek-e-Insaf (PTI), requested the suspension of the non-bailable arrest warrants issued in the Toshakhana case, but his request was denied by the Islamabad district court on March 16, 2023. Additional district and sessions judge Zafar Iqbal announced the verdict and ordered the authorities concerned to arrest the former prime minister and present him before the court on March 18.

Additionally on the same day, the Lahore High Court again ordered the police to postpone their attempt to detain former prime minister Imran Khan at his property in Zaman Park until Friday at 11 a.m (17 March).

References

2023 protests
2023 in Pakistani politics
2020s in Islamabad
Events in Islamabad
Imran Khan
March 2023 events in Pakistan
Pakistan Tehreek-e-Insaf
2023≠